On Thin Ice is a 1933 British crime film directed by Bernard Vorhaus and starring Ursula Jeans, Kenneth Law and Dorothy Bartlam. It was produced as a quota quickie.

Cast
 Ursula Jeans as Lady Violet  
 Kenneth Law as Harry Newman  
 Dorothy Bartlam as Unidentified Role  
 Viola Gault as Mabel  
 Stewart Thompson as Corry 
 Cameron Carr as Mr Newman

References

Bibliography
 Chibnall, Steve. Quota Quickies: The Birth of the British 'B' Film. British Film Institute, 2007.
 Low, Rachael. Filmmaking in 1930s Britain. George Allen & Unwin, 1985.
 Wood, Linda. British Films, 1927-1939. British Film Institute, 1986.

External links

1933 films
1933 crime films
British crime films
Films directed by Bernard Vorhaus
British black-and-white films
1930s English-language films
1930s British films
Quota quickies